Thaumatophyllum (formerly Meconostigma) is a genus of flowering plants in the arum family, Araceae. Its species are native to northern (tropical) South America.

Taxonomy
The genus Thaumatophyllum was erected by Heinrich Wilhelm Schott in 1859, with the sole species Thaumatophyllum spruceanum. In 1962, G.M. Barroso transferred T. spruceanum to Philodendron. (However, the transfer was not made correctly and Barroso's name Philodendron spruceanum is illegitimate.) While in Philodendron, T. spruceanum was placed, along with other species, in subgenus Meconostigma. A series of molecular phylogenetic studies, particularly from 2008 onwards, suggested that, when broadly circumscribed, Philodendron was not monophyletic. In 2018, it was proposed that subgenus Meconostigma should be raised to the rank of genus, under the name Thaumatophyllum. The proposal has been accepted by Plants of the World Online, among other taxonomic databases.

The generic epithet Thaumatophyllum comes from Ancient Greek  ("miracle") +  ("leaf").

Phylogeny
Relationships among the former subgenera of Philodendron and related genera are not yet fully resolved. Several studies that have produced a resolved tree suggest that relationships may be of the form:

Species
, Plants of the World Online accepted the following species:
Thaumatophyllum adamantinum (Mart. ex Schott) Sakur., Calazans & Mayo
Thaumatophyllum bipinnatifidum (Schott ex Endl.) Sakur., Calazans & Mayo
Thaumatophyllum brasiliense (Engl.) Sakur., Calazans & Mayo
Thaumatophyllum corcovadense (Kunth) Sakur., Calazans & Mayo
Thaumatophyllum dardanianum (Mayo) Sakur., Calazans & Mayo
Thaumatophyllum leal-costae (Mayo & G.M.Barroso) Sakur., Calazans & Mayo
Thaumatophyllum lundii (Warm.) Sakur., Calazans & Mayo
Thaumatophyllum mello-barretoanum (Burle-Marx ex G.M.Barroso) Sakur., Calazans & Mayo
Thaumatophyllum paludicola (E.G.Gonç. & Salviani) Sakur., Calazans & Mayo
Thaumatophyllum petraeum (Chodat & Vischer) Sakur., Calazans & Mayo
Thaumatophyllum saxicola (K.Krause) Sakur., Calazans & Mayo
Thaumatophyllum solimoesense (A.C.Sm.) Sakur., Calazans & Mayo
Thaumatophyllum speciosum (Schott ex Endl.) Sakur., Calazans & Mayo
Thaumatophyllum spruceanum Schott
Thaumatophyllum stenolobum (E.G.Gonç.) Sakur., Calazans & Mayo
Thaumatophyllum tweedieanum (Schott) Sakur., Calazans & Mayo
Thaumatophyllum uliginosum (Mayo) Sakur., Calazans & Mayo
Thaumatophyllum undulatum (Engl.) Sakur., Calazans & Mayo
Thaumatophyllum venezuelense (G.S.Bunting) Sakur., Calazans & Mayo
Thaumatophyllum williamsii (Hook.f.) Sakur., Calazans & Mayo
Thaumatophyllum xanadu (Croat, J.Boos & Mayo) Sakur., Calazans & Mayo

References

 
Araceae genera